Everything is a compilation album by Teenage Jesus and the Jerks, released on July 18, 1995 by Atavistic Records. Despite its misleading title, it is actually just a reissue of side one of Lydia Lunch's 1986 Hysterie compilation plus two tracks from Pre Teenage Jesus and the Jerks.

Track listing

Personnel
Adapted from the Everything liner notes.

Teenage Jesus and the Jerks
 Kawashima Akiyoshi (Reck) – bass guitar (10, 11)
 James Chance – alto saxophone (10, 11)
 Bradley Field – drums, percussion
 Lydia Lunch – vocals, electric guitar
 Jim Sclavunos – bass guitar (1, 5, 6, 7, 8, 9)
 Gordon Stevenson – bass guitar (2, 3, 4, 12)

Production and additional personnel
 Julia Gorton – cover art
 Michael Romanowski – mastering (10, 11)
 J. G. Thirlwell – mastering (1–9, 12)

Release history

References

External links 
 

1995 compilation albums
Teenage Jesus and the Jerks albums
Atavistic Records compilation albums